The Zuqnin Chronicle is a medieval chronicle written in Classical Syriac language, encompassing the events from Creation to  CE. It was most probably produced in the Zuqnin Monastery near Amida (the modern Turkish city of Diyarbakır) on the upper Tigris. The work is preserved in a single handwritten manuscript (Cod. Vat. 162), now in the Vatican (shelf mark Vatican Syriac 162). The fourth part of the chronicle provides a detailed account of life of Christian communities in the Middle East, including regions of Syria, Mesopotamia, Palestine and Egypt, during and after the Muslim conquest.

It consists of four parts. The first part reaches to the epoch of Constantine the Great, and is in the main an epitome of the Eusebian Chronicle. The second part reaches to Theodosius II and follows closely the Ecclesiastical History of Socrates of Constantinople; while the third, extending to Justin II, reproduces the second part of the History of John of Ephesus (of interest because this part is lost elsewhere). The fourth part is not, like the others, a compilation but the original work of the author and reaches to the year 774-775, apparently the date when he was writing.

The scholar Assemani ascribed it to Dionysius I Telmaharoyo, another Syriac chronographer of the late eighth century (hence the proposed name "Chronicle of Pseudo-Dionysius", used by some scholars). On the publication of the fourth part of the chronicle by Chabot, it was shown by Theodor Nöldeke, and Nau, that Assemani had been mistaken, and that the largest part of the chronicle in question was the work of an earlier writer, most probably Joshua the Stylite, from Zuqnin, whose neme is inserted in the 9th century colophon of a preserved manuscript containing the chronicle.

The author was an amateur historian, and his aim was moral instruction, not history "as such". His work most clearly depended on earlier works, and has thus be accused of plagiarism. However all points to him being honest in what he recounted. Partially because of these intentions, the author frequently described the portents in this chronicle. This chronicle involves a drawing of Halley's Comet in 760 and auroral drawings in 771/772 and 773 June.

Manuscript Cod. Vat. 162 is the autograph, and in fact the first draft of the manuscript. No further recension, or copy, is known.

Chronicle contains various historical data on Christian communities of the Near East, and their relations with local Muslim authorities. It also contains notes on local culture, languages and various peoples. When referring to his people, the author used the term Suryaye (Syriacs), and also Aramaye (Arameans) as a synonym, defining his people as "sons of Aram", or "children of Aram". Commenting on that question, professor Amir Harrak, a prominent Assyrian scholar and supporter of Assyrian continuity, noted as editor of the Chronicle: 

{{Quote|text="Northern Syria, the Jazlra of the Arab sources, had been the homeland of the Aramaeans since the late second millennium B.C. Syriac-speaking people were the descendants of these Aramaeans, as the expression above indicates."}}

In this Chronicle, under the influence of Biblical symbolism, term Assyrians'' was used as a metaphorical designation for Muslim Arabs as conquerors and rulers of the land, who were rhetorically described, as noted by Amir Harrak, by the extensive use of Biblical references to animosity between ancient Hebrews and Assyrians, hat was a common motive in various medieval chronicles.

References

Sources

External links
Vat. sir. 162, digitised manuscript

Texts in Syriac
Syriac Christianity
Syriac chronicles
8th-century books
775
8th-century Christian texts
Historiography of the early Muslim conquests
Christian texts of the medieval Islamic world